Lachezar Shumkov (born 28 February 1992) is a Bulgarian swimmer. He competed in the men's 50 metre breaststroke event at the 2017 World Aquatics Championships. In 2019, he represented Bulgaria at the 2019 World Aquatics Championships held in Gwangju, South Korea and he competed in the men's 50 metre breaststroke event. He did not advance to compete in the semi-finals.

References

1992 births
Living people
Bulgarian male swimmers
Place of birth missing (living people)
Male breaststroke swimmers
20th-century Bulgarian people
21st-century Bulgarian people